Gabriela Doina Đukanović (née Tănase; former Hobjila; born 6 March 1979) is a Romanian former handballer. She competed in the women's tournament at the 2000 Summer Olympics.

International honours
EHF Cup Winners' Cup:
Winner: 2006  
EHF Champions Trophy:
Third place: 2006

Personal life
She is sister-in-law to former President of Montenegro Milo Đukanović.

References

1979 births
Living people
People from Drobeta-Turnu Severin
Romanian female handball players
Handball players at the 2000 Summer Olympics
Olympic handball players of Romania
SCM Râmnicu Vâlcea (handball) players
Expatriate handball players
Romanian expatriates in Croatia
Romanian expatriates in Montenegro